Below is the list of populated places in Sinop Province, Turkey by the districts. In the following lists first place in each list is the administrative center of the district

Sinop
 Sinop
 Abalı, Sinop
 Ahmetyeri, Sinop
 Akbaş, Sinop
 Alasökü, Sinop
 Aloğlu, Sinop
 Avdan, Sinop
 Bektaşağa, Sinop
 Bostancılı, Sinop
 Çakıldak, Sinop
 Çiftlik, Sinop
 Çobanlar, Sinop
 Demirci, Sinop
 Dibekli, Sinop
 Dizdaroğlu, Sinop
 Erikli, Sinop
 Eymir, Sinop
 Fidanlık, Sinop
 Göller, Sinop
 Göllü, Sinop
 Hacıoğlu, Sinop
 Kabalı, Sinop
 Karapınar, Sinop
 Kılıçlı, Sinop
 Kirençukuru, Sinop
 Korucuk, Sinop
 Kozcuğaz, Sinop
 Lala, Sinop
 Melikşah, Sinop
 Mertoğlu, Sinop
 Oğuzeli, Sinop
 Ordu, Sinop
 Osmaniye, Sinop
 Sarıkum, Sinop
 Sazlı, Sinop
 Sinecan, Sinop
 Şamlıoğlu, Sinop
 Tangaloğlu, Sinop
 Taşmanlı, Sinop
 Taypaklı, Sinop
 Tıngıroğlu, Sinop
 Uzungürgen, Sinop
 Yalı, Sinop

Ayancık
 Ayancık
 Abdülkadirköy, Ayancık
 Ağaçlı, Ayancık
 Akçakese, Ayancık
 Akören, Ayancık
 Aliköy, Ayancık
 Armutluyazı, Ayancık
 Aşağıköy, Ayancık
 Avdullu, Ayancık
 Aygördü, Ayancık
 Babaçay, Ayancık
 Babaköy, Ayancık
 Bahçeli, Ayancık
 Bakırlı, Ayancık
 Bakırlızaviye, Ayancık
 Belpınar, Ayancık
 Büyükdüz, Ayancık
 Büyükpınar, Ayancık
 Çamyayla, Ayancık
 Çaybaşı, Ayancık
 Çaylıoğlu, Ayancık
 Davutlu, Ayancık
 Dedeağaç, Ayancık
 Dereköy, Ayancık
 Dibekli, Ayancık
 Doğanlı, Ayancık
 Dolay, Ayancık
 Erdemli, Ayancık
 Erikli, Ayancık
 Fındıklı, Ayancık
 Göldağı, Ayancık
 Gölköy, Ayancık
 Gürpınar, Ayancık
 Gürsökü, Ayancık
 Hacılı, Ayancık
 Hacıoğlu, Ayancık
 Hatip, Ayancık
 Hüseyinbey, Ayancık
 İnaltı, Ayancık
 Kaldırayak, Ayancık
 Karakestane, Ayancık
 Karapınar, Ayancık
 Kestanelik, Ayancık
 Kızılcakaya, Ayancık
 Kozcuğaz, Ayancık
 Kozsökü, Ayancık
 Köseyakası, Ayancık
 Kurtköy, Ayancık
 Kütükköy, Ayancık
 Maden, Ayancık
 Mestan, Ayancık
 Mustafakemalpaşa, Ayancık
 Ortalık, Ayancık
 Otmanlı, Ayancık
 Ömerdüz, Ayancık
 Pazarcık, Ayancık
 Sofu, Ayancık
 Söküçayırı, Ayancık
 Sulusökü, Ayancık
 Tarakçı, Ayancık
 Tepecik, Ayancık
 Tevfikiye, Ayancık
 Topağaç, Ayancık
 Türkmen, Ayancık
 Uzunçam, Ayancık
 Ünlüce, Ayancık
 Yarenler, Ayancık
 Yemişen, Ayancık
 Yenice, Ayancık
 Yenigüler, Ayancık
 Yeşilyurt, Ayancık
 Zaviye, Ayancık

Boyabat
 Boyabat
 Akçakese, Boyabat
 Akyürük, Boyabat
 Alibeyli, Boyabat
 Ardıç, Boyabat
 Arıoğlu, Boyabat
 Aşağıseyricek, Boyabat
 Aşıklı, Boyabat
 Aydoğan, Boyabat
 Bağlıca, Boyabat
 Bayamca, Boyabat
 Bektaş, Boyabat
 Bengübelen, Boyabat
 Benişli, Boyabat
 Binerli, Boyabat
 Boyalı, Boyabat
 Bölüklü, Boyabat
 Bürüm, Boyabat
 Büyükkaraağaç, Boyabat
 Cemalettinköy, Boyabat
 Curkuşlar, Boyabat
 Çaltu, Boyabat
 Çarşak, Boyabat
 Çatpınar, Boyabat
 Çattepe, Boyabat
 Çaybaşı, Boyabat
 Çeşnigir, Boyabat
 Çorak, Boyabat
 Çukurhan, Boyabat
 Çulhalı, Boyabat
 Dağtabaklı, Boyabat
 Darıözü, Boyabat
 Daylı, Boyabat
 Dereçatı, Boyabat
 Dodurga, Boyabat
 Doğrul, Boyabat
 Doğuca, Boyabat
 Düzkaraağaç, Boyabat
 Edil, Boyabat
 Eğlence, Boyabat
 Ekinören, Boyabat
 Emiroğlu, Boyabat
 Engilekin, Boyabat
 Erkeç, Boyabat
 Esengazili, Boyabat
 Esentepe, Boyabat
 Gazideresi, Boyabat
 Gazideretabaklı, Boyabat
 Gökçeağaçsakızı, Boyabat
 Gökçukur, Boyabat
 Göve, Boyabat
 Günpınar, Boyabat
 Hacıahmetli, Boyabat
 Hamzalı, Boyabat
 Ilıcaköy, Boyabat
 İmamlı, Boyabat
 İsaoğlu, Boyabat
 Kadınlı, Boyabat
 Karacaören, Boyabat
 Karamusalı, Boyabat
 Kartaloğlu, Boyabat
 Kavacık, Boyabat
 Kavak, Boyabat
 Kayaboğazı, Boyabat
 Keseköy, Boyabat
 Kılıçlı, Boyabat
 Killik, Boyabat
 Koçak, Boyabat
 Kovaçayır, Boyabat
 Kozanlı, Boyabat
 Kozkule, Boyabat
 Köprücek, Boyabat
 Kurtlu, Boyabat
 Kurusaray, Boyabat
 Kuyucakpınar, Boyabat
 Kuzveren, Boyabat
 Mahmutlu, Boyabat
 Maruf, Boyabat
 Marufalınca, Boyabat
 Muratlı, Boyabat
 Oğlakçılar, Boyabat
 Okçumehmetli, Boyabat
 Osmanköy, Boyabat
 Ömerköy, Boyabat
 Ören, Boyabat
 Paşalıoğlu, Boyabat
 Pirefendideresi, Boyabat
 Salar, Boyabat
 Sarıağaççayı, Boyabat
 Sarıyer, Boyabat
 Şıhlar, Boyabat
 Şıhlı, Boyabat
 Taşhanlı, Boyabat
 Tekke, Boyabat
 Tırnalı, Boyabat
 Uzunçay, Boyabat
 Yabanlı, Boyabat
 Yaylacık, Boyabat
 Yazıköy, Boyabat
 Yenicamili, Boyabat
 Yenikayalı, Boyabat
 Yeniköy, Boyabat
 Yenimehmetli, Boyabat
 Yeşilçam, Boyabat
 Yeşilköy, Boyabat
 Yeşilyörük, Boyabat
 Yeşilyurt, Boyabat
 Yukarıseyricek, Boyabat

Durağan
 Durağan
 Akbel, Durağan
 Akçaalan, Durağan
 Akçabük, Durağan
 Akpınar, Durağan
 Alpaşalı, Durağan
 Alpuğan, Durağan
 Aşağıalınca, Durağan
 Aşağıkaracaören, Durağan
 Ayvacık, Durağan
 Başağaç, Durağan
 Bayat, Durağan
 Beyardıç, Durağan
 Beybükü, Durağan
 Boyabükü, Durağan
 Boyalıca, Durağan
 Cevizlibağ, Durağan
 Çaltucak, Durağan
 Çamlıca, Durağan
 Çampaşasakızı, Durağan
 Çandağı, Durağan
 Çayağzı, Durağan
 Çerçiler, Durağan
 Çorakyüzü, Durağan
 Çöve, Durağan
 Dağdelen, Durağan
 Dereli, Durağan
 Emirtolu, Durağan
 Erduası, Durağan
 Erenköy, Durağan
 Gökçebelen, Durağan
 Gökdoğan, Durağan
 Gölalan, Durağan
 Gölgerişi, Durağan
 Güngören, Durağan
 Gürpınar, Durağan
 Hacımahmutlu, Durağan
 Hacıoğlan, Durağan
 İncir, Durağan
 Kaplangı, Durağan
 Karagüney, Durağan
 Karataş, Durağan
 Kavaklı, Durağan
 Kemerbahçe, Durağan
 Kılıçaslan, Durağan
 Kızılcapelit, Durağan
 Kirencik, Durağan
 Köklen, Durağan
 Köseli, Durağan
 Kuz, Durağan
 Kuzuluk, Durağan
 Olucak, Durağan
 Olukbaşı, Durağan
 Ortaköy, Durağan
 Salarkolu, Durağan
 Sarıkadı, Durağan
 Sarıyar, Durağan
 Sarnıkalıncası, Durağan
 Sofular, Durağan
 Ulupınar, Durağan
 Uzunöz, Durağan
 Yağbasan, Durağan
 Yalnızkavak, Durağan
 Yanalak, Durağan
 Yandak, Durağan
 Yassıalan, Durağan
 Yemişen, Durağan
 Yeniköy, Durağan
 Yeşilkent, Durağan
 Yeşilyurt, Durağan
 Yukarıkaracaören, Durağan

Erfelek 
 Erfelek
 Abdurrahmanpaşa, Erfelek
 Akcaçam, Erfelek
 Akcasöğüt, Erfelek
 Avlağasökü, Erfelek
 Aydınlar, Erfelek
 Balıfakı, Erfelek
 Başaran, Erfelek
 Çayırköy, Erfelek
 Dağyeri, Erfelek
 Değirmencili, Erfelek
 Dereköy, Erfelek
 Emirhalil, Erfelek
 Gökçebel, Erfelek
 Gümüşsuyu, Erfelek
 Güven, Erfelek
 Hacılar, Erfelek
 Hamidiye, Erfelek
 Hasandere, Erfelek
 Himmetoğlu, Erfelek
 Horzum, Erfelek
 Hürremşah, Erfelek
 İncirpınarı, Erfelek
 İnesökü, Erfelek
 Kaldırayak, Erfelek
 Karacaköy, Erfelek
 Karaoğlu, Erfelek
 Kazmasökü, Erfelek
 Kızılcaelma, Erfelek
 Kızılcaot, Erfelek
 Kirazlık, Erfelek
 Kurcalı, Erfelek
 Mescitdüzü, Erfelek
 Meydan, Erfelek
 Ormantepe, Erfelek
 Salı, Erfelek
 Sarıboğa, Erfelek
 Selbeyi, Erfelek
 Soğucalı, Erfelek
 Sorgun, Erfelek
 Şerefiye, Erfelek
 Tatlıca, Erfelek
 Tekke, Erfelek
 Tombul, Erfelek
 Veysel, Erfelek
 Yeniçam, Erfelek
 Yeniköy, Erfelek

Gerze 
 Gerze
 Abdaloğlu, Gerze
 Acısu, Gerze
 Akgüney, Gerze
 Akkıraç, Gerze
 Altınyayla, Gerze
 Başsökü, Gerze
 Belören, Gerze
 Bolalı, Gerze
 Boyalı, Gerze
 Boyalıca, Gerze
 Çağlayan, Gerze
 Çakallı, Gerze
 Çırnık, Gerze
 Gürsökü, Gerze
 Güzelyurt, Gerze
 Hacıselli, Gerze
 Hıdırlı, Gerze
 Hizarçayı, Gerze
 Kabanlar, Gerze
 Kahramaneli, Gerze
 Karlı, Gerze
 Kızılcalı, Gerze
 Kirençukuru, Gerze
 Kuzsökü, Gerze
 Mahmuttırı, Gerze
 Pirahmet, Gerze
 Sarımsak, Gerze
 Sarıyer, Gerze
 Sarnıç, Gerze
 Sazak, Gerze
 Sorkun, Gerze
 Şeyhli, Gerze
 Tatlıcak, Gerze
 Tepealtı, Gerze
 Tokuşlar, Gerze
 Türkmen, Gerze
 Türkmenlioğlu, Gerze
 Yakadibi, Gerze
 Yamacık, Gerze
 Yaykıl, Gerze
 Yenikent, Gerze
 Yuvalı, Gerze

Türkeli 
 Türkeli
 Akçabük, Türkeli
 Alagöz, Türkeli
 Ayaz, Türkeli
 Çatakgeriş, Türkeli
 Çatakgüney, Türkeli
 Çatakörencik, Türkeli
 Direkli, Türkeli
 Düz, Türkeli
 Düzler, Türkeli
 Gaziler, Türkeli
 Gencek, Türkeli
 Gökçealan, Türkeli
 Gündoğdu, Türkeli
 Güzelkent, Türkeli
 Hacı, Türkeli
 Hamamlı, Türkeli
 Işıklı, Türkeli
 Karabey, Türkeli
 Kayabaşı, Türkeli
 Kuşçular, Türkeli
 Kuz, Türkeli
 Oymayaka, Türkeli
 Sarmaşık, Türkeli
 Satı, Türkeli
 Sazkışla, Türkeli
 Taçahmet, Türkeli
 Taşgüney, Türkeli
 Turhan, Türkeli
 Yapraklı, Türkeli
 Yazıcı, Türkeli
 Yeşiloba, Türkeli
 Yusuflu, Türkeli

Dikmen 
 Dikmen
 Akçakese, Dikmen
 Babalıoğlu, Dikmen
 Bucak, Dikmen
 Büyükdağ, Dikmen
 Büyükkızık, Dikmen
 Çanakçı, Dikmen
 Çevikli, Dikmen
 Çorak, Dikmen
 Çukurcaalan, Dikmen
 Dağköy, Dikmen
 Dudaş, Dikmen
 Dumanlı, Dikmen
 Göllü, Dikmen
 Görümcek, Dikmen
 Kadıköy, Dikmen
 Karaağaç, Dikmen
 Karakoyun, Dikmen
 Kerim, Dikmen
 Kuzalan, Dikmen
 Küçükkızık, Dikmen
 Küplüce, Dikmen
 Saray, Dikmen
 Şeyhhüseyin, Dikmen
 Üçpınar, Dikmen
 Usta Köy
 Yakuplu, Dikmen
 Yaykın, Dikmen
 Yaylabeyi, Dikmen
 Yeniköy, Dikmen
 Yukarıçekmez, Dikmen
 Yumaklı, Dikmen

Saraydüzü 
 Saraydüzü
 Akbelen, Saraydüzü
 Arım, Saraydüzü
 Asarcıkcamili, Saraydüzü
 Asarcıkhacıköy, Saraydüzü
 Asarcıkkayalı, Saraydüzü
 Asarcıkkazaklı, Saraydüzü
 Aşağıakpınar, Saraydüzü
 Aşağıdarıçay, Saraydüzü
 Avluca, Saraydüzü
 Bahçeköy, Saraydüzü
 Bahşaşlı, Saraydüzü
 Başekin, Saraydüzü
 Cumakayalı, Saraydüzü
 Cumaköy, Saraydüzü
 Cumatabaklı, Saraydüzü
 Çalpınar, Saraydüzü
 Çampaşalı, Saraydüzü
 Çorman, Saraydüzü
 Fakılı, Saraydüzü
 Göynükören, Saraydüzü
 Hacıçay, Saraydüzü
 Hanoğlu, Saraydüzü
 Karaçaygöleti, Saraydüzü
 Korucuk, Saraydüzü
 Tepeköy, Saraydüzü
 Uluköy, Saraydüzü
 Yalmansaray, Saraydüzü
 Yaylacılı, Saraydüzü
 Yenice, Saraydüzü
 Yukarıakpınar, Saraydüzü
 Yukarıarım, Saraydüzü
 Zaimköy, Saraydüzü

References

Sinop
List